Goran Alexander Sjöström Milošević (born 30 January 1992) is a Swedish professional footballer who plays as a centre back for the Allsvenskan club AIK.

Club career

Early career
Milošević began his career playing for Rissne IF and later transferred to Vasalunds IF. Operating as a striker till the age of 17, at Vasalund he first switched position to the central midfield and was then persuaded to move back to the central defense where he flourished. During the 2010 season he scored five times for Vasalunds IF, one from a penalty kick.

AIK
On the first of February 2011 he signed a four-year contract with his boyhood favourites AIK after a long and drawn out process that included training with AIK rivals Djurgårdens IF. He has also trained with Scottish club Celtic and Serie A club Fiorentina.

When AIK defender Per Karlsson was injured during pre-season training, Milošević was selected to play from start in the first home game of the 2011 season against Mjällby. AIK won the match and Milošević received a lot of attention, not only for being named man of the match, but also for receiving a martial arts inspired kick to the head from Mjällbys Peter Gitselov. During a home game against Malmö FF on 12 June, he provided his first assist for the club.

Liverpool, Arsenal, Spurs and Sunderland all had scouts keeping a very close eye on the young defender. Serbian club FK Partizan and several Dutch clubs, including Ajax have also shown an interest. Bundesliga club Werder Bremen made an official bid for 600,000 euros, a bid that AIK turned down. His agent said that it would be good if the young player stayed with AIK for at least a year before moving on to a bigger club, but adds that if a good deal is offered, it is hard to turn it down.

He made his first goal in a home draw against GIF Sundsvall on 22 April 2012.

Beşiktaş
On 7 January 2015 Milošević signed a 3.5-year (with option to extend 2 more years) deal with Turkish club Beşiktaş for a fee of €1 million.

Loan to Hannover 96
He was loaned to German Bundesliga side Hannover 96 on 1 February 2016 for the remainder of the season.

Loan to Darmstadt 98
On 17 August 2016, Milošević signed a season-long loan deal with Bundesliga side SV Darmstadt 98. He said: "Everybody who has played in the Bundesliga wants to stay there."

Loan to Çaykur Rizespor
On 8 September 2017, he was loaned out to Çaykur Rizespor. On 13 December 2017, his loan agreement was mutually terminated.

Departure 
On 18 December 2017, Milošević's contract was mutually terminated.

Return to AIK
On 28 February 2018 AIK announced they had signed an agreement with Milošević until 31 December 2018.

Milosevic played in 27 games as AIK won the 2018 Allsvenskan.

Nottingham Forest
On 1 February 2019, Milošević signed an eighteen-month contract with EFL Championship side Nottingham Forest. He scored his first goal for Nottingham Forest in a 3–0 win over Middlesbrough on 22 April 2019.

On 28 October 2019, Milošević's contract was terminated by mutual consent.

Vejle BK
On 29 July 2020, Milošević joined Danish Superliga side Vejle Boldklub on a free transfer, signing a two-year deal. He left the club again at the end of the year.

Second return to AIK 
On 29 March 2021, AIK announced that Milošević had signed a one-year contract with AIK over the 2021 Allsvenskan season.

International career

Youth 
Milošević played five games with the Serbian U17 team. In 2011, he accepted the Sweden U19 youth coach Hans Lindbom's invitation to a Sweden U19 training camp and soon received his first cap for both Sweden U19 and U21 squads. In the summer of 2015, he was part of the Sweden U21 squad that won the 2015 UEFA European Under-21 Championship. In 2016, he represented the Sweden Olympic football team at the 2016 Summer Olympics in Rio de Janeiro, Brazil.

Senior 
Milošević made his full international debut for the Sweden national team on 26 January 2013, replacing Nicklas Backman in the 79th minute of a 3–0 friendly win against Finland. He made his competitive international debut for Sweden on 14 June 2015 in a UEFA Euro 2016 qualifier against Montenegro, playing for 90 minutes alongside Erik Berg at centre back in a 3–1 win.

Personal life
Alexander's father Goran Milošević immigrated from Serbia, and his mother Monica is Swedish of Finnish descent.

Career statistics

Club

International

Honours
AIK
Allsvenskan 2018
Sweden U21
UEFA European Under-21 Championship: 2015
Individual
Allsvenskan Award for Best Newcomer: 2011

References

External links

 
 
 
 
 

Living people
1992 births
People from Sundbyberg Municipality
Swedish footballers
Sweden youth international footballers
Sweden under-21 international footballers
Sweden international footballers
Serbian footballers
Serbia youth international footballers
Swedish people of Serbian descent
Swedish people of Finnish descent
Serbian people of Finnish descent
Association football central defenders
Vasalunds IF players
AIK Fotboll players
Beşiktaş J.K. footballers
Hannover 96 players
SV Darmstadt 98 players
Çaykur Rizespor footballers
Nottingham Forest F.C. players
Vejle Boldklub players
Allsvenskan players
Ettan Fotboll players
Süper Lig players
Bundesliga players
English Football League players
Expatriate footballers in Turkey
Expatriate footballers in Germany
Expatriate footballers in England
Footballers at the 2016 Summer Olympics
Olympic footballers of Sweden
Swedish expatriate sportspeople in Germany
Swedish expatriate sportspeople in Turkey
Sportspeople from Stockholm County